Celine Moody (born 4 March 1997) is an Australian rules footballer playing for the  in the AFL Women's (AFLW).

Early life 
Celine is the daughter of Peter Moody, who trained the racehorse Black Caviar. Both attended St Margaret's School, where they played football together. Throughout her junior career Moody usually played as a defender. She trained as an information systems technician for the Australian Army and took a four-year break from football. On her return in 2018, Moody joined Carlton's VFL Women's side. She played 12 games, mostly as a forward and ruckwoman, wearing number 36.

AFLW career 
Having not played football for the previous three years, Moody was eligible to join an AFLW club during the 2018 off-season as a rookie signing. It was revealed that Moody had signed a contract extension with the club on 16 June 2021, after playing every game possible for the club that season.

Statistics
Statistics are correct to the end of the 2021 season.

|- style=background:#EAEAEA
| scope=row | 2019 ||  || 13
| 5 || 0 || 1 || 10 || 2 || 12 || 2 || 3 || 48 || 0.0 || 0.2 || 2.0 || 0.4 || 2.4 || 0.4 || 0.6 || 9.6 || 0
|-
| scope=row | 2020 ||  || 13
| 3 || 0 || 0 || 6 || 0 || 6 || 0 || 2 || 40 || 0.0 || 0.0 || 2.0 || 0.0 || 2.0 || 0.0 || 0.7 || 13.3 || 0
|- style=background:#EAEAEA
| scope=row | 2021 ||  || 13
| 9 || 0 || 0 || 38 || 8 || 46 || 11 || 13 || 130 || 0.0 || 0.0 || 4.2 || 0.9 || 5.1 || 1.2 || 1.4 || 14.4 || 0
|- class=sortbottom
! colspan=3 | Career
! 17 !! 0 !! 1 !! 54 !! 10 !! 64 !! 11 !! 13 !! 218 !! 0.0 !! 0.1 !! 3.2 !! 0.6 !! 3.8 !! 0.8 !! 1.1 !! 12.8 !! 0
|}

References

External links 

Living people
1997 births
Australian rules footballers from Victoria (Australia)
Western Bulldogs (AFLW) players